Tog Humphreys (born Edward Humphreys on 25 April 1968) was an English cricketer. He was a right-handed batsman and right-arm medium-pace bowler who played for Huntingdonshire. He was born in Bedford.

Humphreys made a single List A appearance for the side, during the 2000 NatWest Trophy, against Yorkshire Cricket Board. From the middle order, he scored a duck.

External links
Tog Humphreys at Cricket Archive 

1968 births
Living people
English cricketers
Huntingdonshire cricketers